Roger J. Roth Jr. (born February 5, 1978) is an American politician from Wisconsin. A Republican, he was a member of the Wisconsin State Assembly from 2007 to 2011, and a member of the Wisconsin State Senate since 2015. He was the Republican nominee for Lieutenant Governor of Wisconsin in the 2022 election.

Early life, education, and career before politics
Roth was born in Appleton, Wisconsin on February 5, 1978. Roth graduated from St. Mary Central High School in Neenah, Wisconsin in 1996 and received his bachelor's degree from the University of Wisconsin–Oshkosh in 2001. He was a member of "Students for Bush" while in college, and also worked on Tommy Thompson's reelection campaign. Prior to entering politics, Roth worked for his family's homebuilding business. In 2003, Roth joined the Wisconsin Air National Guard; he served four tours of duty during the Iraq War, doing F-16 maintenance.

Political career 
Roth was a member of the Wisconsin State Assembly as a Republican from 2007 to 2011. He supported a resolution backing a Republican lawsuit challenging the Affordable Care Act, the federal health care reform legislation signed into law by President Barack Obama. Roth called for the repeal of the ACA.

In 2010, Roth sought the Republican nomination for the U.S. House of Representatives seat from Wisconsin's 8th congressional district, seeking to challenge incumbent Democratic Representative Steve Kagen. However, Roth was defeated by Reid Ribble in the Republican primary election.

In the 2014 election, Roth ran for the Wisconsin State Senate against Penny Bernard Schaber in the 19th state Senate district to replace longtime incumbent Michael Ellis, who retired after holding the seat since 1982. The seat covered Appleton and a large portion of the Fox Valley. Roth won the November 2014 election. Roth was reelected to the state Senate in 2018, defeating Democratic nominee Lee Snodgrass. Roth considered seeking the 2016 Republican nomination to fill the U.S. House seat held by Ribble, who decided not to seek reelection. However, Roth ultimately chose not to run.

In 2017, Roth introduced legislation in the state Senate that would abolish the Wisconsin Department of Natural Resources permitting system for wetland filling, allowing developers to fill state wetlands without oversight. Fellow Republican Jim Steineke introduced a companion bill in the state Assembly. The bill was opposed by environmental and conservation groups. The bill was unsuccessful.

As Senate president, Roth opposed proposals to legalize marijuana in Wisconsin.

In January 2019, Roth falsely claimed that Wisconsin Republicans did not curb the powers of the incoming Democratic administration of Governor Tony Evers and State Attorney General Josh Kaul, during the lame-duck session. In fact, after Evers and Kaul unseated Republicans in the 2018 election, the Republican-majority state legislature passed, and outgoing Republican Governor Scott Walker signed, an array of last-minute bills transferring various powers from the executive to the legislature.

In 2020, Roth proposed a resolution in the Wisconsin Senate, condemning human rights abuses and atrocities by the People's Republic of China and the Chinese Communist Party, including the occupation of Tibet, persecution of Uyghurs, harvesting of organs from Falun Gong practitioners and other political prisoners, and restrictions on religious freedom and freedom of speech; the resolution criticized Chinese propaganda efforts and accused the Chinese government of sustained intellectual property theft.

In January 2021, amid a campaign by President Donald Trump to subvert his defeat by Joe Biden  in the 2020 presidential election, Roth opposed a resolution in the Wisconsin Senate to affirm Biden's victory and condemn the U.S. Capitol attack.

As chairman of the Senate Committee on Universities and Technical Colleges, Roth blocked the Evers' nominees to the state technical college system board; years into Evers' governorship, the committee had refused to confirm Evers's nominees while allowing Walker's appointees to continue to serve even though their terms were expired.

In 2021, Roth and fellow Republican Shae Sortwell proposed an amendment to the Wisconsin state Constitution to eliminate elections for the state superintendent, state treasurer, and secretary of state (all positions currently held by Democrats). Roth and Sortwell's proposed amendment would convert these positions into appointed posts filled by the governor with confirmation by the state Senate.

On February 27, 2022, Roth announced his campaign for Lieutenant Governor of Wisconsin, with a sizeable funding lead compared to his opponents. On August 9, 2022, he won the primary alongside Trump-endorsed gubernatorial candidate and businessman Tim Michels. On November 8, 2022, the pair lost to the Democratic ticket of incumbent Governor Tony Evers and State Assemblywoman Sara Rodriguez in the general election.

Personal life 
His uncle, Toby Roth, was a member of the United States House of Representatives from Wisconsin from 1979 to 1997.

Electoral history

Notes

External links
 Campaign Website
 Official legislative website

|-

1978 births
21st-century American politicians
Businesspeople from Wisconsin
Living people
Republican Party members of the Wisconsin State Assembly
Military personnel from Wisconsin
Politicians from Appleton, Wisconsin
Presidents of the Wisconsin Senate
Republican Party Wisconsin state senators
University of Wisconsin–Oshkosh alumni